The white-winged serotine (Pseudoromicia tenuipinnis) is a species of vesper bat.

It can be found in the following countries: Angola, Burundi, Cameroon, Republic of the Congo, Democratic Republic of the Congo, Ivory Coast, Equatorial Guinea, Ethiopia, Gabon, Gambia, Ghana, Guinea, Guinea-Bissau, Kenya, Liberia, Nigeria, Rwanda, Senegal, Sierra Leone, Tanzania, and Uganda. It is found in subtropical or tropical forests and moist savanna.

References

Pseudoromicia
Bats of Africa
Taxonomy articles created by Polbot
Mammals described in 1872
Taxa named by Wilhelm Peters
Taxobox binomials not recognized by IUCN